Christopher Lake is a village in the Canadian province of Saskatchewan within the District of Lakeland No. 521 and Census Division No. 15. The village lies in the boreal forest of central Saskatchewan, 2 km south and east of a large lake of the same name (Christopher Lake). The village is approximately 40 km north of the City of Prince Albert and about 5 km east of its partner resort area of Emma Lake, west of the junction of Highway 2 and 263. Christopher Lake is home to the Little Red River Cree First Nation band government.

History 
Christopher Lake incorporated as a village on March 1, 1985.

Demographics 

See also

 List of communities in Saskatchewan
 Villages of Saskatchewan

References

External links
Rural Municipality of Lakeland, 521

Villages in Saskatchewan
Lakeland No. 521, Saskatchewan
Division No. 15, Saskatchewan